Elizabeth Smith Miller ( Smith; September 20, 1822 – May 23, 1911), known as "Libby", was an American advocate and financial supporter of the women's rights movement.

Biography
Elizabeth Smith was born September 20, 1822 in Peterboro, New York. She was the daughter of antislavery philanthropist Gerrit Smith and his spouse, the abolitionist Ann Carroll Fitzhugh. In 1843, Elizabeth married Charles Dudley Miller. Elizabeth and Charles occupied the "Cottage Across the Brook", on her father's estate at Peterboro, New York.  It was later the home of their son, Gerrit Smith Miller. The family later moved to Geneva, New York, where Miller died on May 23, 1911, aged 88.

National Women's Right Convention
At the third National Women's Rights Convention gavelled in Syracuse, Smith Miller was the author of a motion to create state-based women's rights organizations when the motion to create a national organization failed. She was with Elizabeth Cady Stanton and Susan B. Anthony in the founding of the National Woman Suffrage Association.

Literary activity
Following her father's death in 1874, Elizabeth Smith Miller worked on a biography of his life along with author Octavius Brooks Frothingham. When Frothingham went so far as to allege that Smith had prior knowledge of John Brown's raid on Harper's Ferry, Elizabeth ordered the publisher to recall the tomes, break their bindings, and remove the information. In her later years, she penned a home economics treatise.

"Bloomers"
An advocate of Victorian dress reform, Elizabeth Smith Miller first wore the Turkish pantaloons and knee length skirt later popularized by Amelia Bloomer in The Lily.  The apparel and its undergarment was similar to utilitarian outfits also worn by women of the utopian Oneida Community and the Oneida Nation's women.

Dress reform was seen as essential in liberating women from the functional constraints imposed on their activities by conventions reinforcing a male dominated society. "Bloomers" were worn by leaders of the women's rights movement as an act of rebellion until the amount of attention the protest received in the popular press became a distraction from the movement.

Publications
 In the Kitchen, Boston: Lee and Shepard, 1875. full text available at the Library of Congress Archive.org Google Books

References

External links
 Elizabeth Smith Miller and Anne Fitzhugh Miller NAWSA Suffrage Scrapbooks
 Webcast-Catch the Suffragist's Spirit: Miller Scrapbooks from the Library of Congress
 Carrie Chapman Catt Collection at the Library of Congress has volumes from the library of Elizabeth Smith Miller.
 In the Kitchen by Elizabeth Smith Miller. From the Katherine Golden Bitting Collection at the Library of Congress

1842 births
1911 deaths
American abolitionists
American suffragists
People from Geneva, New York
Women civil rights activists
Gerrit Smith